George Douglas (born c. 1869) was a Scottish professional golfer. Douglas tied for third place in the 1896 U.S. Open, held 18 July 1896 at Shinnecock Hills Golf Club in Southampton, New York.

Early life
Douglas was born in Scotland, circa 1869.

Golf career

1896 U.S. Open
Douglas tied for third place in the 1896 U.S. Open, held 18 July 1896 at Shinnecock Hills Golf Club in Southampton, New York. He posted two consistent rounds of 79-79=158 and took home $50 in prize money. The Canadian amateur Andrew Smith tied Douglas on 158 but as an amateur player he could not accept any prize money.

Death
Douglas's date of death is unknown.

References

Scottish male golfers
Scottish emigrants to the United States